The 2009–10 George Mason Patriots men's basketball team represented George Mason University during the 2009–10 college basketball season. The Patriots, led by head coach Jim Larranaga, are members of the Colonial Athletic Association and played their home games at the Patriot Center. They finished the season 17–15, 12–6 in CAA play and lost in the quarterfinals of the 2010 CAA men's basketball tournament to VCU. They were invited to play in the 2010 CollegeInsider.com Tournament where they lost in the first round to Fairfield.

Season notes
 On January 3, 2010, it was announced that sophomore guard Jimmy Nolan will seek a transfer from the team with hopes of obtaining a scholarship with a Division II school.
On May 24, 2009, ESPN rated the 2009-10 George Mason men's basketball recruiting class #1 among non-BCS schools

Awards
Second Team All-CAA
 Cam Long

CAA All Rookie Team
 Luke Hancock

CAA Player of the Week
 Cam Long - Jan. 25

CAA Rookie of the Week
 Luke Hancock - Nov. 16
 Luke Hancock - Nov. 23
 Sherrod Wright - Dec. 28
 Kevin Foster - Feb. 22

Roster

Stats

Game log

|-
!colspan=12 style=| Exhibition

|-
!colspan=12 style=| Regular season

|-
!colspan=12 style=|CAA tournament

|-
!colspan=12 style=|CollegeInsider.com tournament

Recruiting
The following is a list of players signed for the 2010-11 season:

References

George Mason
George Mason Patriots men's basketball seasons
George Mason
George Mason
George Mason